The Additional Articles of the Constitution of the Republic of China are the revisions and constitutional amendments to the original constitution to meet the requisites of the nation and the political status of Taiwan "prior to national unification". The Additional Articles are usually attached after the original constitution as a separate document. It also has its own preamble and article ordering different from the original constitution.

The Additional Articles are the fundamental law of the present government of the Republic of China on Taiwan since 1991, last amended in 2005.

Features

Free area 

The territory controlled by the Government of the Republic of China changed significantly after the Chinese Civil War, and the Republic of China could not hold elections in territories it did not control. Thus, the Additional Articles of the Constitution defines the Free Area (Chinese: , Mandarin: Zìyóu Dìqū, Taiwanese: Chū-iû Tē-khu, Hakka: Chhṳ-yù Thi-khî) to be the territory and the people under the government's effective jurisdiction. Whilst all residents of China are nominally citizens of the Republic, only the citizens who have the right to abode in the Free Area may exercise the full civil and political rights, including right of abode and suffrage.

Direct presidential election 

The Additional Articles requires direct election of the President by the citizens of the free area. The first direct presidential election was held in 1996. Under the original constitution, the President was elected indirectly by the National Assembly.

Government reform and reorganization 
The Additional Articles of the Constitution reformed the government of the Republic of China from a parliamentary system to a de facto semi-presidential system. The National Assembly is de facto abolished, and its functions are exercised directly by the citizens of the Free area. The five-power governmental structure is retained, though it functions closer to the traditional Western trias politica in practice.

Constitutional referendum 

A 2005 amendment regarding on referendum stated that a constitutional amendment or an alteration of the national territory has to be ratified by more than half (50%) of voters of the Free Area in a referendum after passed in the Legislative Yuan with a three-quarters majority. Before that, constitutional amendments and national territory alterations were ratified by the National Assembly.

Comparison of the governmental structure 
Most of the amendments brought by the Additional Articles focuses on the mechanism of separation of powers among central governmental organs. The Additional Articles changed the form of government from parliamentary system to semi-presidential system, enhance the implementation of direct democracy and direct election, reduce the chambers of parliament, and simplify the hierarchy of local governments.

Articles 
The Additional Articles of the Constitution has been amended seven times since the 1990s.

Current Additional Articles of the Constitution contains 12 articles:
 Article 1: Referendum on amendment to the Constitution and alteration of the national territory.
 Article 2: President and the vice president.
 Article 3: Premier and the Executive Yuan.
 Article 4: Legislative Yuan.
 Article 5: Judicial Yuan.
 Article 6: Examination Yuan.
 Article 7: Control Yuan.
 Article 8: Remuneration and pay of the members of the Legislative Yuan.
 Article 9: Local governments.
 Article 10: Fundamental national policy.
 Article 11: Cross-Strait relations (rights and obligations between people of the free area and mainland China).
 Article 12: Procedure for amending the Constitution.

See also 

 Constitution of the Republic of China
 Temporary Provisions against the Communist Rebellion
 Politics of the Republic of China
 History of Taiwan since 1945

References

External links 

 Additional Articles of the Constitution by the Office of the President, Republic of China (Taiwan)
 English translation of the Additional Articles of the Constitution (2005 reform)
 English translation of the Constitution by the Taiwan Documents Project.
 Constitution day and constitutional government

Law of Taiwan
Government of Taiwan
Additional
Taiwan